Muzaffar Ahmad (known as Kakababu; 5 August 1889 – 18 December 1973) was an Indian-Bengali politician, journalist and a co-founder of Communist Party of India.

Background
Ahmed was born at Musapur village in Sandwip Island in Chittagong District of Bengal Province in the-then British India (in present-day Bangladesh) to Mansur Ali and Chuna Bibi. Ahmed studied at the Asria Senior Madrasa in Bamni, Companiganj. He passed matriculation from Noakhali Zilla School in 1913. In 1918, he was appointed joint secretary of "Bangio Musalman Sahitya Samiti". In 1920, along with Kazi Nazrul Islam he started a new magazine, Nabajug. Later, when another magazine, Dhumketu was launched by Nazrul in 1922, he contributed to it using the pseudonym "Dwaipayana".

Political movement
Ahmed was one of the founders of the Communist Party of India. In 1922, the Bharat Samyatantra Samiti was formed in Calcutta with Ahmed as its secretary. In 1924, he was sentenced to four years in prison because of his role in the Kanpur Bolshevik Conspiracy Case along with S.A. Dange, Nalini Gupta and Shaukat Usmani. He was released due to illness in 1925. In November, 1925 he, along with Kazi Nazrul Islam, Hemanta Kumar Sarkar, and others, organized the Labour Swaraj Party in Bengal. He was one of the main leaders of CPI in the early 1920s along with Abdul Halim and Abdur Rezzak Khan.

On 20 March 1929, the British colonial government arrested 31 labour activists and sent them to Meerut for trial. Ahmed was the chief accused, along with S.A. Dange, Shaukat Usmani, P.C. Joshi and others, was convicted in this so-called Meerut Conspiracy Case. He was released in 1936. He had served the longest term in jail as the chief accused in the Meerut Trial.

After the partition of India in 1947, Ahmed moved to Kolkata rather than staying in East Pakistan (now Bangladesh). On 25 March 1948, the Communist Party of India was banned by the Government of India and Ahmed was imprisoned. He was released from prison in 1951. He was again arrested and imprisoned for two years in 1962, and another time for two years in 1965. He was imprisoned several times in post-Independence India by the Congress government.

Personal life
Ahmed had a daughter, Nargis. She was married to the poet Abdul Quadir.

Legacy

 Co-founder of Communist Party of India, 26 December 1925.
 Founder of National Book Agency, 26 June 1939.
 The headquarters of the Communist Party of India (Marxist) in West Bengal is named after him.
 Ripon Street, a thoroughfare in Kolkata, was renamed "Muzaffar Ahmad Street".

Selected works
 Qazi Nazrul Islam: Smritikatha (in Bengali).
 Amar Jiban O Bharater Communist Party (in Bengali).
 Krishak Samasya (in Bengali)
 Prabase Bharater Communist Party Gathan (in Bengali) 
 Bharater Communist Party Gorar Pratham Jug (in Bengali) 
 Nirbachita Prabandha (in Bengali)

References

1973 deaths
1889 births
People from Sandwip Upazila
Communist Party of India (Marxist) politicians
Indian male journalists
Bengali communists
20th-century Indian journalists
Hooghly Mohsin College alumni
Prisoners and detainees of British India